Caméra Café is a French-born concept of comedy television series exported around the world. Two movie spin-offs have been made in France under the titles of Espace détente and Le Séminaire. It was originally a French television show created by Bruno Solo, Yvan Le Bolloc'h, and Alain Kappauf and it was broadcast from September 2001 to December 2004 on the M6 channel.

700 episodes of 3 minutes each have been produced and were broadcast again on M6 in 2004. The show revolves around a dysfunctional office. Its originality stems from the fact that, within the fiction, the camera is fixed into the automated coffee machine of the office space.

The title is a French pun on "Caméra Cachée", (literally "hidden camera", or Candid Camera for the related TV show).

Plot 

The main originality of the series is the coffee machine, located in the relaxation area of the company, which becomes the point of view of the viewer during each episode. In front of it, parade the employees of the company "Geugène Electro Stim" (G.E.S.) all are caricatured to the grotesque humor, even cynical at times.

This place of choice allows the viewer to live from within the everyday atmosphere of the head office of a large company in the French (such as the presence of a driver for the president, a director of human resources and 'a full-time psychologist), with professional or private discussions that often turn into caricatures.

Some extras pass from time to time down the hall and sometimes serve as spectators in some skits at strategic moments.

Cast

Main 
 Bruno Solo as Hervé Dumont, Purchasing director and Union representative
 Yvan Le Bolloc'h as Jean-Claude , Commercial

Secondary 
 Armelle as Maéva Capucin, Head of archives and inventory and Carole's assistant
 Alexandre Pesle as Sylvain Müller, Accountant
 Jeanne Savary as Jeanne Bignon, Secretary and Jean-Guy's assistant
 Gérard Chaillou as Jean-Guy Lecointre, Chief human resources officer
 Valérie Decobert as Frédérique Castelli, Nancy's secretary
 Alain Bouzigues as Philippe Gatin, Network administrator
 Shirley Bousquet as Nancy Langeais, Chief financial officer
 Sylvie Loeillet as Carole Dussier-Belmont, Chief commercial officer
 Philippe Cura as André Markowicz, Chauffeur
 Noémie Elbaz as Julie Hassan, Switchboard operator
 Karim Adda as Vincent Schneider, Postal service employee
 Marc Andréoni as Serge Touati, Company psychologist
 Chantal Neuwirth as Annie Lepoutre, Trainee
 Tom Novembre as Stanislas Priziwielsky, Digix's accountant
 Sophie Renoir as Eva Kovalsky, Carole 's substitute during her illness
 Lucien Jean-Baptiste as Franck Marchand

Guest 
 Catherine Benguigui as Mireille
 Catherine Jacob as The interior designer
 Chantal Lauby as Emma 
 Valérie Mairesse as Anabelle, depressed cleaning lady
 Mathilda May as The Boss's wife
 Bruno Lochet as Didier Farjex, The chef of the canteen
 Pascal Obispo as himself 
 Guillaume Depardieu as Simon, a former prisoner in reintegration
 Élie Semoun as The Security guard
 Fred Testot as The window cleaner
 Aïssa Maïga as Violette, Jean-Claude's ex
 Christelle Cornil as Yvonne, The maintenance employee
 Raphaël Lenglet as Dimitri, Eva's son
 Bruno Salomone as Thierry
 Riton Liebman as The director

Adaptations 
Caméra Café has seen great export success, having been adapted in:
  Republic of Ireland (2002–2003)
  Canada /  Quebec (2002–2012, 2021–)
  Greece (2002)
  Italy (2003–2008; 2011-2012; 2017)
  Poland (2004)
  Spain (2005–2009)
  Portugal (2006–)
  Philippines (2007–2009)
  Indonesia (2008-)
  Chile (2008)
  Australia
  China (2008-2010)
  Belgium /  Flanders
  Luxembourg
  Switzerland (2008-)
  Macedonia
  Brazil
  La Réunion, the show is both in Créole and French, depending on the origins of the characters.
  Colombia (2008-)
  Vietnam (2010-2011)
  Tunisia (2013)  Camera Cafe Tunisie Officiel
  Turkey (2009-2010)
  Morocco (2010-) the show is both in Darija and French, depending on the characters.
  Algeria (2012-)
  Cambodia (2012)
  Romania (2015-)
 Jordan (2019)
The length of an episode varies on the locale. In Quebec, where the shorter format is less prevalent than in France, episodes are 30 minutes long, commercials included (inversely, the Quebec show Un gars, une fille, originally half an hour long, was reduced to 9 minutes in its French version). Italy kept the 7 minute format and Spain chose a four- to six-minute format.

Episodes

See also

General 
List of French television series
List of Quebec television series
List of Quebec television series imports and exports
Culture of France

Similar works 
The Office
Le Bureau
La Job

References

External links 

Official website of the French version
Official website of the Italian version
Official website of the Philippine version
Official website of the Spanish version
List of all episodes - official streaming

Television shows filmed in Quebec
2000s Canadian sitcoms
2002 Canadian television series debuts
2003 Canadian television series endings
TVA (Canadian TV network) original programming
M6 (TV channel) original programming